Suckling may refer to the process of lactation in which all mammals provide milk for their young
Suckling may also refer to the breastfeeding of a human infant or young child

Suckling may also refer to:

 Suckling (surname)
 Mount Suckling, the highest peak of the Goropu Mountains
 The Suckling, a 1989 horror film
 ScotAirways, formerly Suckling Airways, a British airline

See also
 Suckling pig